Hercule may refer to:

Fictional characters
 Hercules, in Roman mythology
 Hercule Poirot, a detective created by Agatha Christie
 Hercule Flambeau, in the Father Brown mysteries by G. K. Chesterton
 Hercule (Dragon Ball) or Mr. Satan, in the Dragon Ball franchise
 Hercule, from the comic book Pif et Hercule

People
 Hercule, Duke of Montbazon (1568–1654), French peer
 Hercule Audiffret (1603-1659), French orator and religious writer
 Hercule Corbineau (1780–1823), French soldier
 Hercule Dupré (1844–1927), Canadian farmer, lumber merchant, and political figure
 Hercule Mériadec, Duke of Rohan-Rohan (1669–1749)
 Hercule Mériadec, Prince of Guéméné (1688–1757)
 Hercule Nicolet (1801–1872), Swiss lithographer, natural history illustrator, librarian, and entomologist
 Hercule de Serre (1776–1824), French soldier, lawyer, and politician
 Hercule-Louis Turinetti, marquis of Prié (1658–1726), Dutch noble

Other uses
 Hercule (film), a 1938 French comedy film
 French ship Hercule, nineteen ships of the French Navy
 Hercule-class ship of the line, led by the Hercule of 1836
 Hercule (hydrogen balloon), a 1795 observation balloon, companion to L'Intrépide, used by the Compagnie d'Aérostiers (French Aerostatic Corps)

See also
Hercules (disambiguation)
Heracles (disambiguation)
Ercole (disambiguation)